John Joseph Marshall (1807 – September 25, 1870) was a merchant and politician in Nova Scotia, Canada. He represented Guysborough County in the Nova Scotia House of Assembly from 1840 to 1847, from 1850 to 1859 and from 1867 to 1870.

He was born in Guysborough, Nova Scotia, the son of Joseph H. Marshall, and was educated in Sackville. He ran a general store and also served as justice of the peace. Marshall married Esther Maria Ballaine. He was the province's financial secretary from 1857 to 1860. Marshall was opposed to Confederation. He served as speaker for the provincial assembly from 1868 to 1870. He died while in office at his home in Glenkeen, Manchester Township, Nova Scotia.

His uncle John George Marshall also served in the province's assembly.

References 

1807 births
1870 deaths
Nova Scotia Liberal Party MLAs
Speakers of the Nova Scotia House of Assembly
Canadian justices of the peace